Salvatore Nicosia (born 8 March 1963) is an Italian former long-distance runner, that won two medals at the International athletics competitions.

Biography
Salvatore Nicosia has 13 caps in national team from 1982 to 1989.

Achievements

National championships
Salvatore Nicosia has won 2 times the individual national championship.
1 win in 10000 metres (1985)
1 win in Marathon (1994)

References

External links
 

1963 births
Living people
Italian male long-distance runners
Italian male marathon runners
Universiade medalists in athletics (track and field)
Universiade silver medalists for Italy
Medalists at the 1985 Summer Universiade